Alfred Leroy "Roy" Atherton Jr. (November 22, 1921 – October 30, 2002) was a United States Foreign Service Officer and diplomat. He served as United States Ambassador to Egypt in 1979–1983. He was a Middle East expert who helped in the negotiations that led to the 1978 Camp David peace accords between Israel and Egypt.

Early life
Atherton was born on November 22, 1921, in Pittsburgh, Pennsylvania, the son of Alfred Leroy Atherton Sr. and Joanna Reed.

He graduated from Phillips Exeter Academy. He served in the U.S. Army in Europe from 1943 to 1945. He received a B.S. in 1944 and an M.A. in 1947 from Harvard University. He received a Master’s degree in economics from the University of California in Berkeley.

Diplomatic career

Foreign service (1947-1961)
Atherton joined the U.S. Foreign Service in 1947, and served in Stuttgart, Bonn, Damascus, and Aleppo. From 1959 to 1961, he was Iraq-Jordan desk officer, then Officer in Charge for Cyprus, in the Bureau of Near Eastern and South Asian Affairs at the State Department. During 1961-62 he took advanced economic studies at the University of California at Berkeley.

India (1962-1965)
From 1962 to 1965, he was economic officer in Calcutta, India.

Middle East Affairs (1965-1978)
Between 1965 and 1966, he was Deputy Director of the Office of Near Eastern Affairs at the State Department. In 1966 and 1967, he was Country Director for Iraq, Jordan, Lebanon, and Syria. From 1967 to 1970, he was Country Director for Israel and Arab-Israel Affairs. From 1970 to 1974, he was Deputy Assistant Secretary of State for the Bureau of Near Eastern and South Asian Affairs. From 1974 to 1978, he was Assistant Secretary for Near Eastern and South Asian Affairs.

Ambassador at large: Camp David Summit
He became an Ambassador-at-large and was a member of the U.S. negotiating team at the Camp David summit in September 1978.

The summit produced the Camp David Accords. Atherton had spent months preparing both parties for the summit.

Egypt (1979-1983)
He served as United States Ambassador to Egypt from 1979 to 1983, where he was responsible for the largest U.S. mission in the world, with a staff of 872 Americans and 500 Egyptians. After the Camp David Accord many staff were dispatched to help administer the $1.5 billion a year in military assistance. During his tenure the Egyptian President Anwar Sadat was assassinated. After completing his final overseas tour he returned to Washington D.C.

Director General of the Foreign Service (1983-1985)
This was his final post prior to retiring from government service in 1985. The previous year he took on an added task heading up a fellowship program for promising future leaders from the United Kingdom, Australia and New Zealand to study in the United States by the name of the Harkness Fellowships, a program  run by the Commonwealth Fund, a New York-based philanthropic foundation established by Anna M. Harkness.

Service chronology

Memberships, awards and affiliations
 Director of the Harkness Fellowship Program of the Commonwealth Fund of New York
 Director of the Una Chapman Cox Foundation

Academic career
He was a visiting professor of Middle Eastern Affairs at Hamilton College as Sol M. Linowitz Visiting Professor of Government (1991-1992). There, he taught a small seminar on the history and dynamics of the Arab-Israeli conflict. He also was a visiting professor at Mount Holyoke and Birmingham Southern Colleges.

Personal
He married Betty Wylie (1921-2001) from Chicago, Illinois. They had three children; Lynne, Reed and Michael.

He was a member of All Souls Unitarian Church in Washington D.C.

He died at Sibley Memorial Hospital in Washington, on October 30, 2002 from complications related to cancer surgery. He is buried at Rock Creek Cemetery, Washington D.C. along with his wife, Betty Wylie  who died on February 18, 2009.

Ancestry
His paternal ancestors had resided in Lancaster, Massachusetts having been pioneer settlers to the area. He is a direct descendant of James Atherton, who arrived in Dorchester, Massachusetts, in the 1630s. The Atherton family ancestry originated from Lancashire, England.

Further reading
 Eilts, Hermann Fr. "Alfred Leroy (Roy) Atherton, Jr. (1921-2002). (In Memoriam)." Washington Report on Middle East Affairs, vol. 22, no. 1, Jan.-Feb. 2003, p. 45+. Gale General OneFile,

References

External links

 

1921 births
2002 deaths
People from Pittsburgh
Ambassadors of the United States to Egypt
Assistant Secretaries of State for the Near East and North Africa
United States Department of State officials
United States Career Ambassadors
Harvard University alumni
United States Foreign Service personnel
Directors General of the United States Foreign Service
United States Army personnel of World War II
University of California, Berkeley alumni
American expatriates in Germany
American expatriates in Syria
American expatriates in India